Rodrigo Alejandro Toloza Vilches (born 3 May 1984) is a Chilean former footballer who played as an attacking midfielder.

Club career
He arrived at the club from CD Palestino where he appeared in more than 100 matches scoring 27 goals. Toloza has played for the Chile national football team in the sub 17, sub 23 and senior categories. He made his senior debut in 2005 at age 21 in a game against the Peru national football team.

In 2007, he joined Universidad Católica taking a position as quickly and playing quite holder of the matches of the championship. In his first season, he played 19 matches, scored 7 goals being the second scorer of the team.

Honours

Club
 Universidad Católica
 Primera División de Chile (1): 2010
 Copa Chile (1): 2011

External links

1984 births
Living people
Chilean footballers
Chile international footballers
Club Deportivo Palestino footballers
Club Deportivo Universidad Católica footballers
Santiago Wanderers footballers
San Luis de Quillota footballers
Association football midfielders